Football Club Mariupol was a Ukrainian professional football club based in Mariupol, that competed in the Ukrainian Premier League. The club ceased to exist as a result of the Siege of Mariupol, during the 2022 Russian invasion of Ukraine.

From 2002 to 2017, the club was named Illichivets Mariupol under which it participated in European competitions. It was renamed as part of decommunization in Ukraine.

History

Metalurh Zhdanov
Previously the city of Mariupol hosted a football team that competed consistently in Ukrainian republican competitions among teams of physical culture (amateur teams). The first mentioning of a Mariupol team could be traced to 1936 when it lost to Dynamo Kryvyi Rih 0:5 as part of the 1936 Soviet Cup. Next season, in 1937, it was seeded to play against another team from Berdyansk as part of the Ukrainian championship, but did not appear for the game and was eliminated. After that there is no evidence a team that represented the city until after World War II. After the war, Mariupol sometimes was represented by two teams, but usually the main was named Metalurh Zhdanov. At the end of 1958 it was renamed into Avanhard Zhdanov.

Azovstal and Azovets

Football Club Mariupol traces its history to 1960, when it was established as Azovstal based on a former two teams of physical culture (a type of Soviet amateur clubs) FC Avanhard Zhdanov and FC Shakhtar Rutchenkove. 

The new team of masters Azovstal Zhdanov sponsored by the local Azovstal iron and steel works was admitted to Soviet competitions for teams of masters in Class B (at that time the second division). It was eliminated soon in 1964. After skipping one season the club again was admitted for the 1966 Soviet competitions for teams of masters in Class B, now as Azovets. During that time the club stayed in professional competitions a little bit longer and in 1971 changed its name to more recognizable Metalurh. However, soon after changing its name in 1973, the club again was relegated and now for a much longer period of time.

Lokomotyv and Novator
Missing the 1974 season, the club returned to republican competitions in 1975 as Lokomotyv, sponsored now by "Azovmash" which specializes in production of railroad cars as well as mining and metallurgical heavy equipment. Soon before the final collapse of the Soviet Union, the club already playing as Novator was relegated in 1989 to Ukrainian amateur competitions. In 1991 Novator became a champion of the Ukrainian football championship among amateur clubs. Due to reformation of the Ukrainian football competitions, the new amateur champion was admitted to the newly formed Ukrainian First League.

Ukrainian professional club in Mariupol
After the dissolution of the Soviet Union in 1992, the club changed its name to old one Azovets (part of the Azovmash's SC Novator). In summer of 1995 it merged with FC Dynamo Luhansk and during following spring changed its name again to Metalurh.

FC Metalurh Mariupol changed its name to Illichivets during the winter break of the 2002–2003 season when the club was acquired by the Illich Steel and Iron Works.

Illichivets were relegated to Ukrainian First League in the 2006–07 season after finishing 15th (out of 16). However, they returned to the Ukrainian Premier League the following season after finishing as champions in the 2007–08 Ukrainian First League.

Due to the 2014 Russian military intervention in Ukraine, the club was forced to play its home games in Dnipropetrovsk during the 2014-15 season.

FC Mariupol

In 2017 as part of the ongoing decommunization process of Ukraine, the club changed its name of Illichivets to simply FC Mariupol, officially adopting on 14 June 2017 for the 2017–18 Ukrainian Premier League season. Its name came from the Illichivets steelworks, which were named after Vladimir Ilyich Lenin.

Name change

 1960–1966: Azovstal, 6 years
 1966–1971: Azovets, 5 years
 1971–1974: Metallurg, 3 years
 1974–1976: Lokomotiv, 2 years
 1977–1992: Novator, 15 years
 1992–1996: Azovets, 4 years (repeated, in overall 9 years)
 1996–2002: Metalurh, 6 years (repeated, in overall 9 years)
 2002–2017: Illichivets, 15 years
 2017–2022: FC Mariupol

Crest history

Honours
Ukrainian Premier League U–21
 Winners (1): 2013–14
Ukrainian First League
Winners (2): 2007–08, 2016–17
Ukrainian Second League
Winners (1): 1995–96
Ukrainian amateur championship
Winners (2): 1974, 1991

Football kits and sponsors

Coaches and administration

League and Cup history

Soviet Union

Ukraine

 1 tier: 21 (Soviet Union 0 / Ukraine 21)
 2 tier: 10 (Soviet Union 5 / Ukraine 5)
 3 tier: 12 (Soviet Union 8 / Ukraine 4)
 4 tier: 2 (Soviet Unoin 2 / Ukraine –)

European record
Mariupol first qualified for European competitions in 2004 when they played in the UEFA Cup through the UEFA Respect Fair Play ranking award.

Managers
 Mykola Pavlov (1 July 1997 – 12 Nov 2004)
 Ivan Balan (13 Nov 2004 – 22 April 2007)
 Semen Altman (1 July 2007 – 14 Dec 2007)
 Oleksandr Ishchenko (2 Jan 2008 – 2 Sep 2008)
 Illya Blyznyuk (2 Sep 2008 – 1 Nov 2010)
 Oleksandr Volkov (interim) (1 Nov 2010 – 27 Nov 2010)
 Valeriy Yaremchenko (27 Nov 2010 – 5 Oct 2011)
 Ihor Leonov (interim) (6 Oct 2011 – 29 May 2012)
 Mykola Pavlov (29 May 2012 – 30 May 2015)
 Valeriy Kriventsov (22 June 2015 – 10 June 2016)
 Oleksandr Sevidov (10 June 2016 – 22 Sep 2017)
 Oleksandr Babych (22 Sep 2017 – 29 July 2020)
 Ostap Markevych (3 Aug 2020 – present)

See also
FC Illichivets-2 Mariupol
MBK Mariupol, basketball team of the former SC Novator

Notes

References

External links

Official website

 
Football clubs in Mariupol
Association football clubs established in 1960
1960 establishments in Ukraine
Football clubs in the Ukrainian Soviet Socialist Republic
Ukrainian Premier League clubs
Metallurgy association football clubs in Ukraine